Brad Armstrong (born Rod Hopkins; September 23, 1965) is a Canadian pornographic actor, director, producer, screenwriter, and costume designer. He is currently under contract with Wicked Pictures. He has been known as one of the most popular leading men in the sex industry, as well as "The King of Porn" and "The Spielberg of Skin Directors".

Among the films he has directed is Octomom Home Alone (2012).

Early life
Armstrong attended college for commercial art and advertising.

Career
Armstrong worked as a male stripper in Canada for 10 years. He began dancing at age 17 by borrowing a friend's ID. He was introduced to the porn industry by pornographic actress Erica Boyer. His first scene was a sixway with Erica Boyer, Randy Spears, Eric Price, and two other women for the film Bimbo Bowlers From Boston.

Personal life
Armstrong has been married three times, and divorced three times. His first marriage was to Dyanna Lauren. They divorced in 1992. His second marriage was to Jenna Jameson in December 1996. They divorced in 2001. Armstrong's third marriage, to Jessica Drake, began in 2006 and ended in 2021.

Awards

References

External links

 
 
 

1965 births
Canadian costume designers
Canadian erotic dancers
Canadian male pornographic film actors
Canadian pornographic film directors
Canadian pornographic film producers
Canadian male screenwriters
Film directors from Toronto
Living people
Male actors from Toronto
Writers from Toronto